Gjinoc is a village in Suharekë municipality, Kosovo.

Notes

References 

Villages in Suva Reka